Greatest Hits is the third greatest hits compilation by American singer-actress Cher, released in October 1974 by MCA Records. The album was released to close Cher's contract with MCA, her record company since 1971. This release follows the greatest hits albums Golden Greats (1968) and Superpack (1972).
The album peaked at 152 on the Billboard 200 chart.

Track listing

Personnel
Cher - lead vocals
Snuff Garrett - record producer
Al Capps - arrangement assistance
Michel Rubini - arrangement assistance
John Engstead - photography

Charts

Year-end

References

1974 greatest hits albums
Albums produced by Snuff Garrett
Cher compilation albums
MCA Records compilation albums